The Primates were one of the original post-punk / rock bands to come out of Athens, Georgia in the mid 1980s. Their loud, fast in-your-face hedonistic style was reminiscent of West Coast bands X and The Minutemen, but peppered with a definite influence of traditional country music. The Primates consisted of Eric Sales – bass and vocals, Greg Reece – guitar and vocals, and LH Sales Jr. – drums and vocals. Before going three-piece, early in the first years The Primates had a second rockabilly-style guitarist, Mike Whigham. They at one point served as GG Allin's backing band.

References 
 Flagpole Magazine "That Beat in Time – The Primates"
 John Keane Studios Clients List
 Athens Walking Tour, 393 Oconee Street – Stitchcraft Building
 Times-Courier "A Native's Return"
 OnlineAthens.com – Eric Sales returns to Athens
 AthensMusic.net Interview "Redneck GReece"
 Madison Run (song)

American post-punk music groups
University of Georgia
Alternative rock groups from Georgia (U.S. state)
American southern rock musical groups